The Khopyor (also transliterated as Khoper) is a river in European Russia, the biggest left tributary of the river Don.

Fish in the river include bream, zander, common roach, rudd, European chub, ide, bleak, catfish, pike, perch, asp and burbot.

Found near the river elks, hares, herons, swans, eagles, falcons, owls, nightingales, ducks, beavers, pond turtles, snakes (vipers), etc. Previously, there were bison, now exterminated.

The unique nature made Khopyor a favorite place for tourists.

Tributaries
The largest tributaries of the Khopyor are, from source to mouth:
Serdoba (left)
Vorona (right)
Savala (right)
Buzuluk (left)

Towns
Towns on the Khopyor River in orographic sequence (from source to mouth) are:
Balashov, 
Borisoglebsk
Uryupinsk
Novokhopyorsk
Serafimovich.

Downstream from Borisoglebsk, is the Khopyor Nature Reserve, populated with protected beavers, wisents and Russian desman. It also has various protected flora including Iris tenuifloia.

Cultural associations 
In 1834, Mikhail Zagoskin published a collection of ghost stories entitled An Evening on the Khoper River.

According to legend, an oldman Hopper lived in these places of Penza Oblast. One day he went by steppe and saw 12 springs. The old man took a shovel and assembled all the springs in one big stream. On this stream oldman  Hopper built a mill to grind grain for  the peasants from nearby villages. Later the river was given the name of its creator.

The river gave its name to the Khoper-Invest company, infamous for its pyramid scheme fraud.

References

Rivers of Penza Oblast
Rivers of Saratov Oblast
Rivers of Volgograd Oblast
Rivers of Voronezh Oblast